Human Rights Now! was a worldwide tour of twenty benefit concerts on behalf of Amnesty International that took place over six weeks in 1988.  Held not to raise funds but to increase awareness of both the Universal Declaration of Human Rights on its 40th anniversary and the work of Amnesty International, the shows featured Bruce Springsteen and the E Street Band, Sting, Peter Gabriel, Tracy Chapman, and Youssou N'Dour, plus guest artists from each of the countries where concerts were held.

Human rights activists and former prisoners from around the world, led by Sonny Venkatrathnam from South Africa, participated in the tour.  At each location, the artists and Amnesty leaders held a press conference to discuss human rights, and concert-goers were provided with copies of the Universal Declaration in their language and opportunities to sign the Declaration themselves and join the worldwide human rights movement. The tour featured big concerts at big stadiums such as Camp Nou (90,000 people), Népstadion (80,000), JFK Stadium  (78,000), River Plate Stadium (75,000), and Harare (75,000). Only Paris and Toronto got arena shows. The Paris concert was originally going to be Held at a big racing Track that could accommodate 72,000 people, but the promoters changed their minds and it was moved indoors.

The tour was made possible in part by a grant from the Reebok Foundation.  The twenty concerts were the second stage of what subsequently became known collectively as the Human Rights Concerts - a series of music events and tours staged by the US Section of Amnesty International between 1986 and 1998.

Background

The tour was originally conceived by the Executive Director of Amnesty International's U.S. section, Jack Healey after a suggestion from former Executive Director David Hawk, with some limited input from producer Martin Lewis, who had first recruited rock musicians to perform for Amnesty years before for the Secret Policeman's Ball series of benefits. Healey developed the concept with famed rock promoter Bill Graham, who had worked with Healey on Amnesty's shorter, United States-only tour in 1986, titled A Conspiracy of Hope, and who acted as tour director. Healey served as executive producer, leading the team of three producers: Mary Daly, Jessica Neuwirth, and James Radner, father of George Radner. The media strategies for the tour, based on concepts originated by Healey and Lewis, were developed by Healey and Daly and executed by tour media director Magdeleno Rose-Avila and Charles Fulwood, Communications Director for Amnesty International USA.

Performances

Box office score data

References

Amnesty International
Bruce Springsteen concert tours

1988 concert tours